Homona is a genus of moths belonging to the subfamily Tortricinae of the family Tortricidae.

Species

Homona aestivana (Walker, 1866)
Homona anopta Diakonoff, 1983
Homona antitona (Meyrick, 1927)
Homona apiletica Meyrick, 1934
Homona auriga (Durrant, 1915)
Homona bakeri Diakonoff, 1968
Homona baolocana Razowski, 2008
Homona bicornis Diakonoff, 1968
Homona biscutata Meyrick, 1931
Homona blaiki Razowski, 2013
Homona brachysema Diakonoff, 1983
Homona coffearia (Nietner, 1861)
Homona despotis Diakonoff, 1983
Homona difficilis (Meyrick, 1928)
Homona eductana (Walker, 1863)
Homona encausta (Meyrick, 1907)
Homona fatalis Meyrick, 1936
Homona fistulata Meyrick, 1910
Homona intermedia Diakonoff, 1948
Homona issikii Yasuda, 1962
Homona magnanima Diakonoff, 1948
Homona mermerodes Meyrick, 1910
Homona nakaoi Yasuda, 1969
Homona obtusuncus Razowski, 2013
Homona parvanima Razowski, 2008
Homona phanaea Meyrick, 1910
Homona polyarcha Meyrick, 1924
Homona polystriana Razowski, 2008
Homona privigena Razowski, 2013
Homona saclava (Mabille, 1900)
Homona salaconis (Meyrick, 1912)
Homona scutina Diakonoff, 1948
Homona secura (Meyrick, 1910)
Homona spargotis Meyrick, 1910
Homona superbana Kuznetsov, 1992
Homona tabescens (Meyrick, 1921)
Homona trachyptera Diakonoff, 1941
Homona umbrigera Diakonoff, 1952
Homona wetan Diakonoff, 1941

Former species
Homona cyanombra Meyrick, 1935
Homona hylaeana Ghesquire, 1940
Homona myriosema Meyrick, 1936

See also
List of Tortricidae genera

References

 , 2005: World catalogue of insects volume 5 Tortricidae
 , 1863, List Specimens lepid. Insects Colln. Br. Mus. 28: 424.

External links
 tortricidae.com

 
Archipini
Tortricidae genera
Taxa named by Francis Walker (entomologist)